Rosemary Nokuzola Capa , also known as Zoleka Capa, is a South African politician who has served as the Deputy Minister of Agriculture, Rural Development and Land Reform since August 2021. She was Deputy Minister of Small Business Development from May 2019 to August 2021. A member of the African National Congress, she has been a Member of the National Assembly since May 2014. From June 2014 to May 2019, she was the chairperson of the Portfolio Committee on Social Development.

Early life and career
Capa was born in Flagstaff in the Cape Province (now part of the Eastern Cape) during apartheid. She qualified as a nurse and midwife while a trainee at the Holy Cross Hospital in Flagstaff. After the end of apartheid, she spent two terms as the Executive Mayor of the OR Tambo District Municipality. In late 2010, she joined the Eastern Cape Provincial Legislature and was appointed to the Executive Council of the Eastern Cape as Member of the Executive Council (MEC) for Rural Development and Agrarian Reform.

Career in national politics

Committee chairperson
Capa was elected to the National Assembly of South Africa following the general election on 8 May 2014. She was sworn into office on 21 May 2014. The ANC soon announced that Capa was their candidate for chairperson of the Portfolio Committee on Social Development. She was elected chairperson on 25 June 2014.

Capa served as chairperson of the portfolio committee until the dissolution of the term on 7 May 2019.

Deputy Minister
Following the general election of 8 May 2019, Capa returned to Parliament on 22 May 2019. On 29 May 2019, President Cyril Ramaphosa appointed her Deputy Minister of Small Business Development. Capa was sworn in the next day.

On 5 August 2021, she was appointed as Deputy Minister of Agriculture, Rural Development and Land Reform.

Personal life 
She is married to politician Ndumiso Capa.

References

External links

Living people
Year of birth missing (living people)
Xhosa people
People from the Eastern Cape
African National Congress politicians
Members of the National Assembly of South Africa
Women members of the National Assembly of South Africa